The Journal of Pragmatics is a monthly peer-reviewed academic journal covering the linguistic subfield of pragmatics. It was established in 1977 by Jacob L. Mey (at that time Odense University) and Hartmut Haberland (Roskilde University). The current editors-in-chief are Anne Bezuidenhout (University of South Carolina) and  Andreas H. Jucker (University of Zurich). Previous editors-in-chief include Marina Terkourafi (Leiden University; 2017-2021), Michael Haugh (The University of Queensland; 2015-2020), Neal R. Norrick (Saarland University; 2010–2016) and Jonathan Culpeper (Lancaster University; 2009–2014). According to Journal Citation Reports, the journal has a 2021 impact factor of 1.86.

References

External links

Elsevier academic journals
Pragmatics journals
English-language journals
Quarterly journals
Publications established in 1977